A rugby league team consists of thirteen players on the field, with 4 substitutes on the bench. Each of the thirteen players is assigned a position, normally with a standardised number, which reflects their role in attack and defence, although players can take up any position at any time.

Players are divided into two general types, forwards and backs. Forwards are generally chosen for their size and strength. They are expected to run with the ball, to attack, and to make tackles. Forwards are required to improve the team's field position thus creating space and time for the backs. Backs are usually smaller and faster, though a big, fast player can be of advantage in the backs. Their roles require speed and ball-playing skills, rather than just strength, to take advantage of the field position gained by the forwards. Typically forwards tend to operate in the centre of the field, while backs operate nearer to the touch-lines, where more space can usually be found.

Names and numbering

The diagram, right, shows the typical positions of each player during a scrum (not to scale).

The laws of the game recognise standardised numbering of positions. The starting side normally wear the numbers corresponding to their positions, only changing in the case of substitutions and position shifts during the game. In some competitions, such as Super League, players receive a squad number to use all season, no matter what positions they play in.

The positions and the numbers are defined by the game's laws as:

 Backs
 1 Full Back 
 2 Right Wing Threequarter
 3 Right Centre Threequarter
 4 Left Centre Threequarter
 5 Left Wing Threequarter
 6 Stand-off Half or Five-eighth
 7 Scrum Half or Half-back

Forwards
 8 Prop
 9 Hooker or Dummy-half
 10 Front Row Forward
 11 Second Row Forward
 12 Second Row Forward
 13 Lock Forward

In practice, the term 'front row forward' is very rarely used, and a team has two props. The scrum half is often known as the half back, especially in Australasia, and the lock forward is usually known as loose forward in England.

Backs 
There are seven backs, numbered 1 to 7. For these positions, the emphasis is on speed and ball-handling skills. Generally, the "back-line" consists of smaller, more agile players.

Fullback 

Numbered 1, the fullback's primary role is the last line of defence, standing behind the main line of defenders. Defensively, fullbacks must be able to chase and tackle any player who breaks the first line of defence, and must be able to catch and return kicks made by the attacking side. Their role in attack is usually as a support player, and they are often used to come into the line to create an overlap in attack. Fullbacks that feature in their respective nations' rugby league halls of fame are France's Puig Aubert, Australia's Clive Churchill, Charles Fraser, Graeme Langlands, Graham Eadie and Billy Slater, Great Britain/Wales' Jim Sullivan, and New Zealand's Des White.

Threequarters 
There are four threequarters: two wingers and two centres - right wing (2), right centre (3), left centre (4) and left wing (5). Typically these players work in pairs, with one winger and one centre occupying each side of the field.

Wing 
Also known as wingers. There are two wings in a rugby league team, numbered 2 and 5. They are usually positioned closest to the touch-line on each side of the field. They are generally among the fastest players in a team, with the speed to exploit space that is created for them and finish an attacking move. In defence their primary role is to mark their opposing wingers, and they are also usually required to catch and return kicks made by an attacking team, often dropping behind the defensive line to help the fullback. Wingers that feature in their nations' rugby league halls of fame are Great Britain's Billy Batten, Billy Boston and Clive Sullivan, Australia's Brian Bevan, John Ferguson, Ken Irvine, Harold Horder and Brian Carlson,  South African Tom van Vollenhoven and France's Raymond Contrastin.

Centre 
There are only 2 centres, right and left, numbered 3 and 4 respectively. They are usually positioned just inside the wingers and are typically the second-closest players to the touch-line on each side of the field. In attack their primary role is to provide an attacking threat out wide and as such they often need to be some of the fastest players on the pitch, often providing the pass for their winger to finish off a move. In defence, they are expected to mark their opposite centre. Centres that feature in their countries' halls of fame are France's Max Rousié, England's Eric Ashton, Harold Wagstaff and Neil Fox, Wales' Gus Risman and Australia's Reg Gasnier, H "Dally" Messenger, Dave Brown, Jim Craig, Bob Fulton and Mal Meninga.

Half pair
There are two halves. Positioned more centrally in attack, beside or behind the forwards, they direct the ball and are usually the team's main play-makers, and as such are typically required to be the most skillful and intelligent players on the team. These players also usually perform most tactical kicking for their team.

Stand-off / Five-eighth 

Numbered 6, the stand-off or five-eighth is usually a strong passer and runner, while also being agile. Often this player is referred to as "second receiver", as in attacking situations they are typically the second player to receive the ball (after the half-back) and are then able to initiate an attacking move.

Scrum-half / Half-back
Numbered 7, the scrum-half or half-back is usually involved in directing the team's play. The position is sometimes referred to as "first receiver", as half-backs are often the first to receive the ball from the dummy-half after a play-the-ball. This makes them important decision-makers in attack.

Forwards
A rugby league forward pack consists of six players who tend to be bigger and stronger than backs, and generally rely more on their strength and size to fulfill their roles than play-making skills. The forwards also traditionally formed and contested scrums, however in the modern game it is largely immaterial which players pack down in the scrum. Despite this, forwards are still referred to by the position they would traditionally take in the scrum.

Front row
The front row of the scrum traditionally included the hooker with the two props on either side. All three may be referred to as front-rowers, but this term is now most commonly just used as a colloquialism to refer to the props.

Hooker

The hooker or rake, numbered 9, traditionally packs in the middle of the scrum's front row. The position is named because of the traditional role of "hooking" the ball back with the foot when it enters the scrum. It is usually the hooker who plays in the dummy-half position, receiving the ball from the play-the-ball and continuing the team's attack by passing the ball to a teammate or by running with the ball. As such, hookers are required to be reliable passers and often possess a similar skill-set to half backs.

Prop

There are two props, numbered 8 and 10, who pack into the front row of the scrum on either side of the hooker. Sometimes called "bookends" in Australasia, the props are usually the largest and heaviest players on a team. In attack, their size and strength means that they are primarily used for running directly into the defensive line, as a kind of "battering ram" to simply gain metres. Similarly, props are relied upon to defend against such running from the opposition's forwards. Prop forwards that feature in their respective nations' rugby league halls of fame are Australia's Arthur Beetson, Duncan Hall, Frank Burge and Herb Steinohrt and New Zealand's Cliff Johnson.

Back row
Three forwards make up the back row of the scrum: two second-rowers and a loose forward. All three may be referred to as back-rowers.

Second-row forward
Second-row forwards are numbered 11 and 12. While their responsibilities are similar in many ways to the props, these players typically possess more speed and agility and take up a wider position in attack and defence. Often each second rower will cover a specific side of the field, working in unison with their respective centre and winger. Second rowers are often relied upon to perform large numbers of tackles in defence. Second-row forwards that feature in their nations' halls of fame include New Zealand's Mark Graham, Australia's Norm Provan, George Treweek and Harry Bath, France's Jean Galia, and Great Britain & England's Martin Hodgson.

Loose forward / Lock forward 
Numbered 13, the loose forward or lock forward packs behind the two-second-rows in the scrum. Some teams choose to simply deploy a third prop in the loose forward position, while other teams use a more skilful player as an additional playmaker. Loose forwards that feature in their nation's Halls of Fame include Australia's Ron Coote, Johnny Raper, Bradley Clyde and Wally Prigg, Great Britain's Vince Karalius, Ellery Hanley and 'Rocky' Turner, and New Zealand's Charlie Seeling.

Interchange
In addition to the thirteen on-field players, there are a maximum of five substitute players who start the game on their team's bench. Usually, they will be numbered 14, 15, 16, 17 and 18. Each player normally keeps their number for the whole game, regardless of which position they play in. That is, if player number 14 replaces the fullback, they will wear the number 14 for the whole game, and not change shirts to display the number 1. 

The rules governing if and when a replacement can be used have varied over the history of the game; currently they can be used for any reason by their coach – typically because of injury, to manage fatigue, for tactical reasons or due to poor performance. Under current rules, players who have been substituted are typically allowed to be substituted back into the game later on. Leagues in different countries have had different rules on how many interchanges can be made in a game. the Super League allowed up to ten interchanges per team in each game, this was reduced to eight interchanges per team per game, commencing in the 2019 season. Commencing in the 2016 season, Australia's National Rugby League permits up to eight interchanges per team per game. Additionally, if a player is injured due to foul play and an opposition player is has been sin-binned or sent off then the injured player's team is given a free interchange. Often an interchange bench will include at least one (and usually two) replacement props, as it is generally considered to be the most physically taxing position and these players are likely to tire the quickest.

Concussion substitute

Commencing in 2021, a player named as the squad's 18th player on match day is able to take the field when three players fail a head injury assessment; or when a player suffers a match-ending injury caused by foul play, in which the opposing player was either sin-binned or sent off. Since the change, there have been calls to reduce the number of players that suffer a match-ending injury to two players, in the wake of a few incidents in the NRL.

The concussion substitute was used during the 2021 Rugby League World Cup played in 2022, and adopted by the RFL in 2023.

Roles
As well as their positions, players' roles may be referred to by a range of other terms.

Marker
Following a tackle, the defending team may position two players – known as markers – at the play-the-ball to stand, one behind the other facing the tackled player and the attacking team's dummy-half.

Dummy half
The dummy half or (acting half-back) is the player who stands behind the play-the-ball and collects the ball, before passing, running or kicking the ball. The hooker has become almost synonymous with the dummy half role. However, any player of any position can play the role at any time and this often happens during a game, particularly when the hooker is the player tackled.

First receiver
The first receiver is the name given to the first player to receive the ball off the play-the-ball, i.e. from the dummy-half.

Second receiver
If the ball is passed immediately by the first receiver, then the player catching it is sometimes referred to as the second receiver.

Utility
A player who can play in a number of different positions is often referred to as a "utility player", "utility forward", or "utility back".

Goal-kicker
Although any player can attempt his team's kicks at goal (penalty kicks or conversions), most teams have specific players who train extensively at kicking, and often use only one player to take goal kicks during a game.

Captain

The captain is the on-field leader of a team and a point of contact between the referee and a team, and can be a player of any position. Some of the captain's responsibilities are stipulated in the laws.

Before a match, the two teams' captains toss a coin with the referee. The captain that wins the toss can decide to kick off or can choose which end of the field to defend. The captain that loses the toss then takes the other of the alternatives.

The captain is often seen as responsible for a team's discipline. When a team persistently breaks the laws, the referee while issuing a caution will often speak with the team's captain to encourage them to improve their team's discipline.

The captains are also traditionally responsible for appointing a substitute should a player suffer an injury during a game, although in the professional game there are other procedures in place for dealing with this.

See also

Rugby league gameplay

References

 
Rugby league